Ireland competed as a national delegation for the first time at the 1924 Summer Olympics in Paris. The Irish Olympic Council had been admitted to the International Olympic Committee after the Irish Free State's 1922 independence from the United Kingdom of Great Britain and Ireland. The Council regarded itself as an all-Ireland body, including Northern Ireland as well as the Free State; it competed as "Ireland" rather than "Irish Free State". The team used the Irish tricolour as its flag and "Let Erin Remember" anthem. Jack Yates won a silver medal

Aquatics

Water polo

Ireland made its debut Olympic water polo appearance.

Roster
Charles Barrett
James Beckett
James Brady
John Convery
Cecil Fagan
Charles Fagan
Norman Judd
John O'Connor
Michael O'Connor
Noel Purcell

First round
 Bye
Quarterfinals

Athletics

Ten athletes represented Ireland in 1924. It was the nation's debut appearance in the sport as well as the Games.

Ranks given are within the heat.

Boxing 

Seven boxers represented Ireland at the 1924 Games. It was the nation's debut in the sport as well as the Olympics as an independent nation. Dwyer was the most successful Irish boxer, taking fourth place. His three bouts won were three times as many as the rest of the team combined, with Murphy getting the only other win.

Football

The Football Association of the Irish Free State or FAIFS (now the Football Association of Ireland or FAI) sent a team of amateur players to the Olympic tournament,  which was a single-elimination tournament. The Irish Olympic Council shunned the FAIFS as the Council saw itself as an all-Ireland body and the FAIFS was "partitionist" by restricting itself to the Free State. The FAIFS had to liaise directly with FIFA regarding its entry, rather than going through the Council. Contemporary records, such as the FAIFS annual report, regarded these three internationals as full internationals, despite featuring amateur teams. After the 1960s these games were reclassified as amateur internationals. However, in June 1999 FIFA declared that early Olympic internationals could be considered as full internationals. That would make them the first games of what is now the Republic of Ireland team.

Of the 22 entrants, 12 teams played in the first round. The 6 winners then joined another 10 teams, including Ireland, in the second round. On May 28 at the Stade Olympique, the Ireland beat Bulgaria 1-0 with Paddy Duncan scoring the only goal. As a result of this win they qualified for the quarter-finals. On June 2 they played the Netherlands at the  Stade de Paris in Saint-Ouen but lost 2-1 after extra-time. However, the following day, before returning home, the team played one more game, beating Estonia, 3-1 in a friendly at the Stade Olympique.

 Round 1 Bye

 Round 2

 Quarterfinals

Final rank 5th place

Players reserves: 
John Lea  (Shelbourne)
Frank Heaney (St James's Gate)
Robert Cowzer  (Shelbourne)
Ernie Crawford (Bohemians)
Th. Aungier
J. Healy

*Note: Murphy, Thomas, Robinson and Dowdall only played in friendly against Estonia.

Tennis

 Men

 Women

 Mixed

Notes

References

Sources

Citations

Nations at the 1924 Summer Olympics
1924
Olympics
Republic of Ireland national football team – record in major tournaments